Putineiu may refer to several places in Romania:

 Putineiu, a commune in Giurgiu County
 Putineiu, a commune in Teleorman County